Ropica affinis is a species of beetle in the family Cerambycidae. It was described by Breuning in 1939.

References

affinis
Beetles described in 1939